Trees Grow on the Stones Too is a 1985 Soviet drama film directed by Knut Andersen and Stanislav Rostotsky.

Plot 
The film tells about the young man Kuksha, who is captured by the Vikings, but he did not give up and for the courage shown got name Einar Happy. Ahead of him is waiting for a lot of adventures, the Vikings promise him a prosperous life, but he wants to return home.

Cast 
  as Kuksja
 Petronella Barker as Signy
 Tor Stokke as Torir
 Torgeir Fonnlid as Sigurd
 Jon Andresen as Harald
 Lise Fjeldstad as Tyra
  as Olav (as Viktor Sjulgin)
 Mikhail Gluzskiy as 'Fleinskallen'
 Per Sunderland as Guttorm
 Valentina Titova as Kuksjas mor

References

External links 
 

1985 drama films
1985 films
Danish-language films
Norwegian historical drama films
Norwegian multilingual films
Norwegian-language films
1980s Russian-language films
Soviet historical drama films
Soviet multilingual films
Films directed by Knut Andersen
Films directed by Stanislav Rostotsky